The following is a comprehensive list of music records released by Neneh Cherry.

Albums

Studio albums

Remix albums

Live albums

Singles

As lead artist

As featured artist

Videos

Video releases

Music videos

References

Discographies of Swedish artists
Pop music discographies